Lawrence B. Gibbs (born August 31, 1938) is an American attorney who served as the Commissioner of Internal Revenue from 1986 to 1989.

References

1938 births
Living people
Commissioners of Internal Revenue
Texas Republicans